Luca Nizzetto (born 8 March 1986) is an Italian footballer who plays as a midfielder for an amateur side Vigasio.

References

External links
 

1986 births
Footballers from Verona
Living people
Italian footballers
A.C. Mezzocorona players
U.S. Cremonese players
Trapani Calcio players
Modena F.C. players
Virtus Entella players
Serie B players
Serie C players
Association football midfielders